Ljubojević is a Serbo-Croatian surname. Notable people with the surname include:

Darko Ljubojević (born 1975), retired Bosnian Serb footballer
Divna Ljubojević (born 1970), Serbian singer
Goran Ljubojević (born 1983), retired Croatian footballer
Ljubomir Ljubojević (born 1950), Serbian Grandmaster of chess
Petar Ljubojević, Austrian captain of the Varaždin Generalate

Croatian surnames
Serbian surnames
Slavic-language surnames
Patronymic surnames
Surnames from given names